Joseph Robert Morris (April 24, 1828  December 6, 1885) was a metal worker, business owner, investor, and inventor. He briefly served as mayor of Houston, Texas.

Early life and family
Joseph Robert Morris was born on April 24, 1828 in Milton, Connecticut, now a part of Litchfield. He attended school through the age of fourteen, when he moved to New Haven, Connecticut for an apprenticeship to a tinner. He moved with his two younger brothers and his father to Bastrop, Texas around 1845.

Career
Morris established a tin shop in Bastrop that quickly failed. He relocated to Houston with his family, where he performed metal work for Alexander McGowan. The next year, in 1847, he set up his own tin shop in Houston, which later expanded into a general hardware business. His inventions included a furnace and a spark arrester, and he gained membership to the British Academy of Sciences.

Morris co-founded two transportation companies: the Houston Direct Navigation Company and the Buffalo Bayou Ship Channel Company. According to the 1870 Census, he was one of the wealthiest persons in Texas.

Death
Morris died on December 6, 1885. His final resting place is Glenwood Cemetery (Houston, Texas) in Houston.

References

1828 births
1885 deaths
Mayors of Houston
Burials at Glenwood Cemetery (Houston, Texas)
19th-century American businesspeople